Aptina Imaging Corporation was a company that sold CMOS imaging products.  Their CMOS sensors were used in Nikon V1 (10.1 MP, CX format, 16.9x17.9 mm), Nikon J1, Nikon V2. By 2009 year Aptina had a 16% share of the CMOS image sensors market, with revenue estimated at $671 million. The company was acquired in 2014 by ON Semiconductor

History 
Aptina Imaging was created as a spin-off of Micron Technology's Image Sensor Division in March 2008. At this time it still was an independent division within Micron. In July 2009, Aptina became an independent, privately held company, and was partially sold to a group including TPG and Riverwood Capital. ON Semiconductor Corporation completed the acquisition of Aptina Imaging in August 2014.

Milestones 
 2014 - ON Semiconductor completes acquisition of Aptina Imaging
 2014 - Aptina Imaging has bought color filter array processing and imager probe assets from Micron Technology, and close to 100 Micron employees will join Aptina’s manufacturing facility in Nampa, Idaho on Aug. 4.
 2014 - Aptina Ships the First 1-Inch 4K Image Sensor for Security and Surveillance Solutions
 2011 - Shipped 2nd billionth sensor
 2009 - Aptina spins out as an independent privately held company
 2008 - Shipped 1 billionth sensor
 2008 - Micron Technology launches Aptina: a CMOS image sensor division
 2006 - Micron Imaging Group acquires Avago Technologies' image sensor business
 2006 - World’s first 1.4-µm CMOS pixel
 2005 - World’s first 1.75-µm CMOS pixel
 2002 - First Micron image sensor products launched
 2001 - Micron Imaging Group acquires Photobit
 1995 - Photobit established to commercialize CMOS active pixel sensor technology
 1992-1995 - JPL team invented CMOS active pixel sensor technology

Awards
 2011 - AET (China) Best Product Award Winner: AR0331
 2010 - Winner, EDN Innovation Award: MT9H004
 2009 - Finalist, EDN Innovation Award: MT9M033
 2008 - Takayanagi Award: Presented to Dr. Junichi Nakamura
 2008 - Best Supplier Award: Foxconn

References

External links
 Aptina web-site (with ON Semiconductor)
 Aptina Corporate Fact Sheet

Semiconductor companies of the United States
Equipment semiconductor companies
Private equity portfolio companies
2014 mergers and acquisitions
Micron Technology